David Da Cunha (born May 19, 1983 in Vierzon) is a French professional football player. Currently, he plays in the Championnat de France amateur for Les Herbiers VF. He played on the professional level in Ligue 2 for LB Châteauroux and he also played one game for LB Châteauroux in the 2004–05 UEFA Cup.

1983 births
Living people
People from Vierzon
French footballers
Ligue 2 players
LB Châteauroux players
Les Herbiers VF players
AS Moulins players
SO Romorantin players
Association football defenders
Sportspeople from Cher (department)
Footballers from Centre-Val de Loire